The second season of The Sing-Off began on December 6, 2010. The number of a cappella groups was increased from eight to ten, with all acts coming from the United States. Nick Lachey remained as host and the three judges, Ben Folds, Shawn Stockman and Nicole Scherzinger, also returned. Deke Sharon returned as music director and vocal producer. The music staff included Ed Boyer, Ben Bram, and Bill Hare. The program was broadcast for five nights in December with the finale on December 20. The season premiere averaged 8.5 million viewers. On the finale, the group Committed became the second champion of the show, beating Street Corner Symphony, The Backbeats and Jerry Lawson & Talk of the Town.

This was Scherzinger's last season as a judge.

Groups

Elimination table

Call-out order

 This group was eliminated.

 Unexpectedly, Committed, Street Corner Symphony, The Backbeats, and Jerry Lawson & Talk of the Town were all sent to the finale. In fact, this is the first and currently only Sing-Off season to have all four groups make it to the season finale.

Performances

Episode 1 (December 6, 2010)
Theme: Contestant's choice
Group performance: "I've Got the Music in Me" by Kiki Dee

Episode 2 (December 8, 2010)
Theme: Songs from the past five years
Group performance: "Use Somebody" by Kings of Leon
Guest performance: "I Gotta Feeling" by The Black Eyed Peas, performed by Nota

Episode 3 (December 13, 2010)
Theme: Rock songs (first round), guilty pleasure songs (second round)
Group performance: "21 Guns" by Green Day

Episode 4 (December 15, 2010)
Theme: Medley of an iconic artist (first round), judges' choice (second round)
Group performance: "With a Little Help from My Friends" by The Beatles

Episode 5: Finale (December 20, 2010)
Group performances: "Put a Little Love in Your Heart" by Jackie DeShannon and "What Christmas Means to Me" by Stevie Wonder, with Nick Lachey

Ratings

Post Sing-Off alumni
The winning group, Committed, released their first album, Committed, which peaked at No. 171 on the US Billboard 200 chart, No. 31 on the Top R&B/Hip-Hop Albums chart and No. 3 on the Top Heatseekers chart.
Pitch Slapped member Ingrid Andress began a solo country music career in 2019.

Discography
The Sing-Off released two recordings of studio performances of participants.

The Sing Off: Harmonies For The Holidays (2010)

 Pitch Slapped: "Joy to the World"
 On the Rocks: "White Christmas"
 The Backbeats: "O Holy Night"
 Eleventh Hour: "Santa Claus is Comin' to Town"
 Men of Note: "The First Noel"
 The Whiffenpoofs: "God Rest Ye, Merry Gentlemen"
 Committed: "Angels We Have Heard on High"
 Jerry Lawson & Talk of the Town: "Silent Night"
 Groove for Thought: "We Three Kings"/"O Come, O Come, Emmanuel"
 Street Corner Symphony: "Auld Lang Syne"

The Sing-Off Season 2 Finalists: The Studio Sessions EP (2010)

 Committed: "Apologize"
 The Backbeats: "Landslide"
 Jerry Lawson & Talk of the Town: "Mercy"
 Street Corner Symphony: "Creep"

References

External links
 NBC official website
 
 

2010 American television seasons